Tabor Reformed Church, also known as Tabor United Church of Christ, is a historic Reformed church located at 10th and Walnut Streets in Lebanon, Lebanon County, Pennsylvania. 
It is currently the home of the LCBC (Lives Changed by Christ) Church. 
It was built between 1792 and 1796, and is a -story, limestone building measuring 42 feet by 62 feet. It has a four-story stone tower with spire, slate covered gable roof, and a chapel added in 1914.

It was added to the National Register of Historic Places in 1980.

References

External links
Tabor United Church of Christ website
LCBC, Lebanon, PA  

Churches on the National Register of Historic Places in Pennsylvania
Churches completed in 1796
Churches in Lebanon County, Pennsylvania
United Church of Christ churches in Pennsylvania
18th-century churches in the United States
National Register of Historic Places in Lebanon County, Pennsylvania
1796 establishments in Pennsylvania